

Oftfor was a medieval Bishop of Worcester. He was consecrated in 691. He died after April 693.

Citations

References

External links
 

Bishops of Worcester
7th-century English bishops
7th-century births
Year of death unknown